Kibbeh nayyeh or raw kibbeh is a Lebanese mezze. It consists of minced raw lamb mixed with fine bulgur and spices.

Kibbeh nayyeh is often served with mint leaves, olive oil, and green onions. Pita bread is used to scoop it. It is sometimes served with a sauce of garlic or olive oil. The dish has a unique versatility in that any leftovers are cooked, creating a different dish.

Many recipes call for kibbe nayyeh as the "shell" for cooked kibbe, as well. In this case, however, the kibbe nayyeh is rolled into a ball and stuffed with lamb, onions, pine nuts and spices, then fried.

As in other dishes based on raw meat, health departments urge to exercise extreme caution when preparing and eating this kind of food. Kibbeh nayyeh is a popular dish among Christians in the Middle East on regular and holiday occasions such as Christmas and Easter. It is also a popular dish among Druze in Israel.

See also
Kibbeh
Çiğ köfte, a similar dish
Kitfo, a similar dish
 List of beef dishes
 List of lamb dishes
 List of meat dishes
Kafta, a similar dish
Mett, similar German dish

References

Maronite cuisine
Levantine cuisine
Lebanese cuisine
Syrian cuisine
Jordanian cuisine
Appetizers
K
Lamb dishes
Ground meat
Potentially dangerous food
Raw beef dishes
Bulgur dishes
Druze culture
Christmas food
Easter food